The United University Club was a London gentlemen's club, founded in 1821. It occupied the purpose-built University Club House, at 1, Suffolk Street, London, England, from 1826 until 1971.

Formation and membership
The Club was founded at a meeting held at the Thatched House Tavern on 30 June 1821 and held its first Annual General Meeting at Willis's Rooms on 27 April 1822, under the chairmanship of Prince William Frederick, Duke of Gloucester and Edinburgh.

It was agreed that the Club would admit no more than one thousand members and former members of the Universities of Oxford and Cambridge, five hundred from each. This limitation remained in place for more than one hundred years. As a result, only eight years after the Club's foundation, its waiting list was so long that a second club was formed, called the Oxford and Cambridge Club.

The initial entrance-fee was set at twenty-five guineas and the annual subscription at six guineas. By 1879, these figures had increased to thirty guineas and eight guineas. It was reported in Dickens's Dictionary of London (1879) that "The members elect by ballot, one black ball in ten excludes".

Premises
The Club's premises, called the University Club House, were at 1, Suffolk Street, London near Trafalgar Square. They were designed by the architect William Wilkins RA and by his colleague J. P. Gandy and opened on 13 February 1826.  Wilkins was also the architect of the nearby National Gallery in Trafalgar Square, finished in 1838, and of the main buildings of Downing College, Cambridge.

The Club was re-built on a grander scale in 1906, with Reginald Blomfield as architect. In 1906, friezes by Henry Alfred Pegram RA (1862–1937) were also commissioned.
An extension was added on the north side of the building in 1924 (again designed by Blomfield) and another extension on the east side in 1939–40.

Sir Nikolaus Pevsner described the development as "Sir Reginald Blomfield’s essay in Champs Elysées style".

Merger with New University Club
A third club for members of the two Universities, founded in 1864 and called the New University Club, had its rooms at 57 St James's Street. This amalgamated with the United University Club in 1938.

Merger with Oxford and Cambridge Club
After the Second World War, the gentlemen's clubs of London fell into a decline, and in 1971 the United University Club closed its premises. In March 1972, it was merged with the Oxford and Cambridge Club. The combined club was initially called the 'United Oxford and Cambridge University Club' and in 1972–73 was housed at the University Club House, but thereafter it occupied the club house further down Pall Mall designed for the Oxford and Cambridge Club in 1836. The lease of the University Club House was surrendered to the ground landlord, the Crown Estate. The merged University club reverted to the name "Oxford and Cambridge Club" in 2001.

Uses of the Club House since 1973

Number One Suffolk Street was occupied from 1973 until 1980 by the bankers Coutts & Co., from 1980 to 1997 by the British School of Osteopathy, and since 1998 as the London Centre of the University of Notre Dame.  The Centre enables the Colleges of Arts & Letters, Business Administration, Science, Engineering and the Law School to develop their own programs in London.

Distinguished past members
William Ewart Gladstone (1809–1898), prime minister
Stanley Baldwin, 1st Earl Baldwin of Bewdley (1867–1947), prime minister
John Maynard Keynes, 1st Baron Keynes (1883–1946), economist
Arthur Peel, 1st Viscount Peel (1829–1912), Speaker of the House of Commons 1884–1895
Frederic Thesiger, 1st Viscount Chelmsford (1868–1933), Viceroy of India 1916–1921
John George Dodson, 1st Baron Monk Bretton (1825–1897), politician
Alexander Staveley Hill KC MP (1825–1905), barrister and politician
Douglas Freshfield (1845–1934), mountaineer
Sir Owen Seaman (1861–1936), editor of Punch 1906–1932
Herbert Trench (1865–1923), poet
Sir Leslie Scott KC MP (1869–1950), barrister and politician
Sir Herbert Brent Grotrian, 1st Baronet (1870–1951), barrister and politician
Geoffrey Winthrop Young (1879–1958), mountaineer and poet
Percy Herbert, Bishop of Norwich (1885–1968)
Sir Ivor Jennings (1903–1965), Vice-Chancellor of the University of Cambridge
J. C. C. Davidson, 1st Viscount Davidson (1889–1970), politician

See also
List of London's gentlemen's clubs

References

Further reading
 Graves, Charles, Leather Armchairs: The Chivas Regal Book of London Clubs (London, Cassell & Co. Ltd, 1963, with foreword by P. G. Wodehouse).
 Thole, John, and Matthews, Stephen, The Oxford and Cambridge Clubs in London (London, Alfred Waller, 1992). .
 Lejeune, Anthony, Gentlemen's Clubs of London, ill. Malcolm Lewis (London: Macdonald and Jane's, 1979). .

 United University Club, victorianlondon.org.

Organizations established in 1821
Organizations disestablished in 1972
Gentlemen's clubs in London
Organisations associated with the University of Oxford
Organisations associated with the University of Cambridge
Buildings and structures in the City of Westminster
Defunct clubs and societies of the United Kingdom
History of the City of Westminster
History of the University of Oxford
History of the University of Cambridge
Oxbridge
1821 establishments in England